Jimmy Clark (9 September 1908 – 11 April 1979) was an Australian rugby union player,  a flanker who made five  representative Test appearances for the Australian national team in the 1930s, captaining in the side in one of these matches. He made 15 appearances for the Queensland state team from 1930 being the period of the revival of the code in Queensland, following its dormancy since World War I.

Rugby career
Clark was born in Mount Perry near Bundaberg, Queensland and attended St Joseph's College, Gregory Terrace.

He made his state representative debut for Queensland against a visiting British side in 1930. The following year he was picked in the national team to tour to New Zealand as vice-captain to Syd Malcolm. He played in seven of the tour's ten matches including two Tests. One of these Tests was against a New Zealand Māori rugby union team and Clark captained the side. It was a mid-week tour match at the time, but was decreed in 1986 as a Test match by the Australian Rugby Union. Accordingly, Clark posthumously earned the honour of being a Wallaby Test captain. His brother Phil Clark was also on that tour.

In 1932 he played in two domestic Test matches when New Zealand toured Australia. The following year he was selected for the first-ever Wallaby tour of South Africa. He played in one Test on tour and in eight other minor matches with injury restricting his game time on the tour.

References

Footnotes

Bibliography
 Howell, Max (2005) Born to Lead - Wallaby Test Captains, Celebrity Books, Auckland NZ

   

Australian rugby union players
Australian rugby union captains
Australia international rugby union players
1908 births
1979 deaths
Rugby union flankers
Rugby union players from Queensland